Chanda Surendra Singh Gaur  is an Indian politician and a member of the Indian National Congress party.

Career

Political career
She became an MLA in 2013.

Political views
She supports the Congress Party's ideology.

Personal life
She is married to Surendra Singh Gaur.

See also
Madhya Pradesh Legislative Assembly
2013 Madhya Pradesh Legislative Assembly election
2008 Madhya Pradesh Legislative Assembly election

References

1975 births
Living people
21st-century Indian women politicians
21st-century Indian politicians
Indian National Congress politicians from Madhya Pradesh
Madhya Pradesh MLAs 2013–2018
Women members of the Madhya Pradesh Legislative Assembly